Max Kaltenmark (11 November 1910 – 26 June 2002) was a French sinologist, of Austrian origin.

Between 1949 and 1953, he was director of the "Centre d'études sinologiques de Pékin" of the École française d'Extrême-Orient. He later was directeur d'études at the École pratique des hautes études in Paris until 1979.

Selected works 
1953: Le Lie-Sien Tchouan : biographies légendaires des immortels taoïstes de l'antiquité
1965: Lao Tseu et le taoïsme
1972: La Philosophie chinoise (Que sais-je?).

References

External links 
 Maxime Kaltenmark (1910-2002) on Persée
 Notes à propos du Kao-Mei on ISIDORE

1910 births
Writers from Vienna
2002 deaths
French sinologists
Academic staff of the École pratique des hautes études
Austrian emigrants to France